The 2013 CONCACAF Beach Soccer Championship took place from 8–12 May 2013, in Nassau, Bahamas, for the first time. This will also be the first time that the qualifiers have been held in the Caribbean. The two finalists of the championship qualified for the World Cup and represented North America in Tahiti.

All matches took place at the new Malcolm Park Beach Soccer and Futsal Facility in Nassau.

Participating teams
The original record total of 11 teams were revealed on April 19, 2013.

North American Zone:
 
 
 

Central American Zone:
 
 
 

Caribbean Zone:
 
 
 
 

A team from Guyana was scheduled to participate, but withdrew from the tournament on 7 May 2013 due to administrative reasons. Guyana was scheduled to compete in Group B. Due to Guyana's withdrawal, the schedule was slightly modified as a result.

Group stage
The draw to determine the groupings was conducted at the Atlantis Paradise Island Hotel in Nassau, the Bahamas, on 23 April 2013 at 1 PM EDT. The subsequent schedule was released two days later.

All match times are correct to that of local time in Nassau, being Eastern Daylight Time, (UTC -4).

Group A

Group B

Group C

Placement matches

Ninth place match

Seventh place match

Fifth place match

Knockout stage
After the group stage matches were completed, a draw was held after the last match to determine the semifinal matchups involving the group winners and the best second-place team.

Semifinals

Third place match

Final

Winners

Awards

Qualifying teams

Top scorers
11 goals
 Nick Perera

Final standings

References

2013
Qualification Concacaf
2013 in beach soccer